The Tamron SP 35mm F1.8 Di VC USD is an interchangeable moderate wide-angle prime lens for cameras with a full frame sensor or smaller. On an APS-C camera, it has a field of view similar to normal human vision. It was announced by Tamron on September 2, 2015.

References

Camera lenses introduced in 2015
35